Mezhdurechye is a rural locality (a Posyolok) in Kolsky District of Murmansk Oblast, Russia. The village is located beyond the Arctic circle, on the Kola Peninsula. IT is 43 m above sea level.

References

Rural localities in Murmansk Oblast
Kolsky District